Eulagisca is a genus of marine polychaete worms belonging to the family Polynoidae. The genus includes 5 species which are all found in the Southern and Antarctic Oceans and are notable for reaching a large size - 180 mm or more long - larger than any other species of Polynoidae.

Description
Species of Eulagisca have 35–41 segments and 15 pairs of elytra. The lateral antennae are undivided and inserted terminally on the prostomium . There is a distinctive dorsal fold ("nuchal flap" in the taxonomic literature) on segment 2, and unlike the related genus Pareulagisca, in Eulagisca all notochaetae are stout and have blunt tips.

Species
Five species of Eulagisca are recognised as of August 2020:

Eulagisca corrientis McIntosh, 1885
Eulagisca gigantea Monro, 1939
Eulagisca macnabi Pettibone, 1997
Eulagisca puschkini Averincev, 1972
Eulagisca uschakovi Pettibone, 1997

References

Phyllodocida